Ray Drummond (born November 23, 1946 in Brookline, Massachusetts) is an American jazz bassist and teacher. He also has an MBA from Stanford University, hence his linkage to the Stanford Jazz Workshop. He can be heard on hundreds of albums and co-leads The Drummonds with Renee Rosnes and (not related) Billy Drummond.

Drummond has been a resident of Teaneck, New Jersey, since 1980 with his wife, Susan, and his daughter, Maya.

He is the elder brother of David Drummond, who served as senior vice president, corporate development and chief legal officer of Google Inc., until his retirement in 2020.

Discography

As leader
 1984: Susanita (Nilva) with Manny Boyd, Branford Marsalis, John Hicks, Alvin Queen
 1989: Two of a Kind (Theresa) with John Hicks
 1989: Camera in a Bag (Criss Cross) with David Newman, Kenny Barron, Steve Nelson, Marvin Smith
 1989: One to One (DMP) with Bill Mays
 1990: One to One 2 (DMP) with Bill Mays
 1991: The Essence (DMP) W/ Hank Jones, Billy Higgins
 1992: Excursion (Arabesque)
 1994: Continuum (Arabesque)
 1995: Vignettes (Arabesque)
 1997: 1-2-3-4 (Arabesque)

As sideman
With Chris Anderson
 Blues One (DIW, 1991)
With Toshiko Akiyoshi
 Remembering Bud: Cleopatra's Dream (Nippon Crown, 1990)
With Bill Barron
Variations in Blue (Muse, 1983)
The Next Plateau (Muse, 1987 [1989])
With Kenny Barron
The Only One (Reservoir, 1990)
Lemuria-Seascape (Candid, 1991)
Live at Bradley's (EmArcy, 1996 [2001])
Live at Bradley's II (Sunnyside, 1996 [2002])
With Thomas Chapin
I've Got Your Number (Arabesque, 1993)
With Arnett Cobb
 Funky Butt (Progressive, 1980)
With George Coleman
 At Yoshi's (Theresa, 1989)
With Ted Curson
 The Trio (Interplay, 1979)
With Billy Drummond
Native Colours, (Criss Cross. 1992)
With Teddy Edwards
Close Encounters (HighNote, 1996 [1999]) with Houston Person
Smooth Sailing (HighNote, 2001 [2003])
With Art Farmer
 Mirage (Soul Note, 1982)
 Warm Valley (Concord, 1983)
With the Art Farmer/Benny Golson Jazztet
 Moment to Moment (Soul Note, 1983)
 Back to the City (Contemporary, 1986)
 Real Time (Contemporary, 1986 [1988])
With Ricky Ford
Future's Gold (Muse, 1983)
Saxotic Stomp (Muse, 1987)
With Curtis Fuller
Blues-ette Part II (Savoy, 1993)
With Benny Golson
I Remember Miles (Alfa Jazz, 1993)
That's Funky (Meldac Jazz, 1995)
With Johnny Griffin
Return of the Griffin (Galaxy, 1978)
NYC Underground (Galaxy, 1979 [1981])
To the Ladies (Galaxy, 1979 [1982])
With Slide Hampton
 World of Trombones (West 54, 1979)
With Craig Handy
Split Second Timing (Arabesque, 1992)
With Tom Harrell
 Stories
With John Hicks
 Is That So? (Timeless, 1991)
 Beyond Expectations (Reservoir, 1993)
 Lover Man: A Tribute to Billie Holiday (Red Baron, 1993)
With Buck Hill
Capital Hill (Muse, 1990)
The Buck Stops Here (Muse, 1992)
With Freddie Hubbard
 The Eternal Triangle (Blue Note, 1987) with Woody Shaw
 Feel the Wind (Timeless, 1988) with Art Blakey
With Bobby Hutcherson
 Bobby Hutcherson Live at Montreux (Blue Note, 1973)
 Cirrus (Blue Note, 1974)
 Good Bait (Landmark, 1985)
With the Jazztet
 Moment to Moment (Soul Note, 1983)
With Randy Johnston
Walk On (Muse, 1992)
With Etta Jones
At Last (Muse, 1995)
Easy Living (HighNote, 2000)
With Lee Konitz
Live at Laren (Soul Note, 1979 [1984])
With Peter Leitch
Landscape (Jazz House, 2014)
With Ronnie Mathews
Roots, Branches & Dances (Bee Hive, 1978)
With Charles McPherson
Manhattan Nocturne (Arabesque, 1998)
With Grachan Moncur III
 Exploration  (Capri, 2004)
With Frank Morgan
Bop! (Telarc, 1997)
With Idris Muhammad
 Kabsha (Theresa, 1980)
With David Murray
 I Want to Talk About You (Black Saint, 1986)
 Ming's Samba (Portrait, 1988)
 Fast Life (DIW/Columbia, 1991)
 Ballads for Bass Clarinet (DIW, 1991)
 Saxmen (Red Baron, 1993)
 Jazzosaurus Rex (Red Baron, 1993)
 Creole (Justin Time, 1997)
 Like a Kiss that Never Ends (Justin Time, 2000)
 Sacred Ground (Justin Time, 2006)
With Houston Person
Person-ified (HighNote, 1997)
My Romance (HighNote, 1998)
Soft Lights (HighNote, 1999)
Blue Velvet (HighNote, 2001)
Thinking of You (HighNote, 2007)
Mellow (HighNote, 2009)
Moment to Moment (HighNote, 2010)
So Nice (HighNote, 2011)
Naturally (HighNote, 2012)
Nice 'n' Easy (HighNote, 2013)
The Melody Lingers On (HighNote, 2014)
Something Personal (HighNote, 2015)
With Pharoah Sanders
 Journey to the One (Theresa, 1980)
 Shukuru (Theresa, 1981 [1985])
With Woody Shaw
 Imagination (Muse, 1987)
With Horace Silver
 Music to Ease Your Disease (Silvertone, 1988)
With James Spaulding
 Songs of Courage (Muse, 1991 [1993])
Blues Nexus (Muse, 1993)
Escapade (HighNote, 1999)
With Horace Tapscott
 Thoughts of Dar es Salaam (Arabesque, 1997)
With Bob Thiele Collective
 Lion Hearted (1993)
With Jack Walrath
Journey, Man! (Evidence 1995)
With Michael White
 Spirit Dance (Impulse!, 1971)
 Pneuma (Impulse!, 1972)
With John Zorn
 Voodoo (Black Saint, 1985)

References

External links
 Official web site

Stanford University alumni
American jazz double-bassists
Male double-bassists
Arabesque Records artists
1946 births
Living people
People from Brookline, Massachusetts
People from Teaneck, New Jersey
Jazz musicians from Massachusetts
21st-century double-bassists
21st-century American male musicians
American male jazz musicians
The Jazztet members
Criss Cross Jazz artists